Olov Englund (born 5 March 1983) is a Swedish bandy player who currently plays for Kalix Bandy as a defender.  Englund is now a member of Sweden's national team and started playing in the Bandy World Championship 2007.

Englund has only played for three clubs.
His list of clubs are as follows-
  Kalix Bandy (1999–2004)
  Hammarby IF (2004–2007)
  Zorkij (2007–2008)
  Hammarby IF (2008–2013)
  Kalix Bandy (2013–present)

External links
 
 

1983 births
Living people
Swedish bandy players
Expatriate bandy players in Russia
Swedish expatriate sportspeople in Russia
Kalix BF players
Hammarby IF Bandy players
Zorky Krasnogorsk players
Sweden international bandy players
Bandy World Championship-winning players